The Big Parade is a 1925 American silent film about World War I.

The Big Parade may also refer to:

The Big Parade (1986 film), a Chinese drama directed by Chen Kaige
"The Big Parade" (Dad's Army), an episode of the British sitcom Dad's Army

See also
"Big Parade", a song from the self-titled debut album by The Lumineers
Parade (disambiguation)